Frank Mitchell MacPherson (March 29, 1884 – November 11, 1981) was a Canadian politician and funeral director.

MacPherson was born to Peter MacPherson, and Mary McCaw at Wooler, Ontario. He attended public schooling at Smith Falls, Ontario and Kingston, Ontario. He came to Cranbrook around 1910. In Cranbrook he owned the Hanson Garage Company and operated F. M. MacPherson Funeral Service. He also served as an alderman on the Cranbrook City Council.

He was elected to the Legislative Assembly of British Columbia at the 1928 British Columbia general election, running for the Liberal party, defeating Conservative incumbent Noel Stirling Austin Arnold Wallinger. He would be re-elected in  1933 and again in 1937. In 1933 he was appointed by premier Thomas Dufferin Pattullo as minister of public works in 1933. In 1944 Macpherson was serving as Commissioner of the Board of Transport Commission of Canada. At the time he resided in Ottawa and had retired from his businesses in Cranbrook.

He married Edythe Lawrie July 21, 1909. With her he had two sons, Marshall Frank in 1913 and Allan Mitchell. He died in Ottawa on November 11, 1981.

Electoral history

|Liberal
|Frank Mitchell MacPherson
|align="right"|1,833
|align="right"|52.46%
|align="right"|
|align="right"|unknown

|- style="background:white;"
! style="text-align:right;" colspan="3"|Total valid votes
!align="right"|3,494
!align="right"|100.00%
!align="right"|
|- style="background:white;"
! style="text-align:right;" colspan="3"|Total rejected ballots
!align="right"|55
!align="right"|
!align="right"|
|- style="background:white;"
! style="text-align:right;" colspan="3"|Turnout
!align="right"|%
!align="right"|
!align="right"|
|}  	  	  	  	

|Co-operative Commonwealth Fed.
|Charles Bennett
|align="right"|1,231 	 		 	
|align="right"|29.01%
|align="right"|
|align="right"|unknown

|Liberal
|Frank Mitchell MacPherson
|align="right"|2,951
|align="right"|69.53%
|align="right"|
|align="right"|unknown
|- style="background:white;"
! style="text-align:right;" colspan="3"|Total valid votes
!align="right"|4,244  
!align="right"|100.00%
!align="right"|
|- style="background:white;"
! style="text-align:right;" colspan="3"|Total rejected ballots
!align="right"|33
!align="right"|
!align="right"|
|- style="background:white;"
! style="text-align:right;" colspan="3"|Turnout
!align="right"|%
!align="right"|
!align="right"|
|}

|Liberal
|Frank Mitchell MacPherson
|align="right"|3,110
|align="right"|76.73%
|align="right"|
|align="right"|unknown

|Co-operative Commonwealth Fed.
|Samuel Smith Shearer
|align="right"|943
|align="right"|23.27%
|align="right"|
|align="right"|unknown
|- style="background:white;"
! style="text-align:right;" colspan="3"|Total valid votes
!align="right"|4,053  
!align="right"|100.00%
!align="right"|
|- style="background:white;"
! style="text-align:right;" colspan="3"|Total rejected ballots
!align="right"|79
!align="right"|
!align="right"|
|- style="background:white;"
! style="text-align:right;" colspan="3"|Turnout
!align="right"|%
!align="right"|
!align="right"|
|}

References

1884 births
1981 deaths
British Columbia Liberal Party MLAs